The Jim Rose Circus is a modern-day version of a circus sideshow. It was founded in Seattle in 1991 by Jim Rose and his wife BeBe Aschard Rose. The sideshow came to prominence to an American audience as a second stage show at the 1992 Lollapalooza festival, then called the "Jim Rose Circus Sideshow", although they had toured the Northwest and Canada and had several US TV appearances before this time. Rolling Stone magazine called the show an "absolute must-see act" and USA Today termed Rose's troupe "Lollapalooza's word-of-mouth hit attraction".

Tours
After Lollapalooza, in 1993 Jim Rose headlined seven world tours and released a self-titled video on Rick Rubin's American Recordings. This video quickly became a cult classic. 

In 1994, the Jim Rose Circus was chosen to tour with Nine Inch Nails, Pop Will Eat Itself and a then-unknown Marilyn Manson, and later with KoRn and Godsmack.  1998 saw another world tour featuring female sumo wrestling, Mexican transvestite wrestling and chainsaw football.  The show landed Rose and troupe in jail in Lubbock, Texas and for four months the show was banned from New Zealand. 

Jim Rose was also the top ticket of the Melbourne (Australia), New Zealand and Edinburgh (Scotland) Fringe and Comedy Festivals.

Performers

Rose himself performs in between acts, mostly comedy but often stunts as well such as attaching paper currency to his forehead with a staple gun, driving a long nail into his nostril and having darts thrown into his back. During the show's final act, he would escape from a straitjacket. His most outrageous trick followed: he would invite audience members to stand on his head after he had placed it in a shallow crate of broken glass.

 The Amazing Mister Lifto (Joe Hermann) who hung heavy weights (cinder blocks, steam irons, beer kegs, etc.) from his body piercings, including those in his nipples and genitalia. At Lollapalooza Lifto would perform the "genital lift" feat after spraying shaving cream on himself.
 Bebe the Circus Queen (Beatrice Aschard) would perform a variety of stunts such as having a watermelon placed on her back and split with a sword, lying on a bed of nails while weights were placed on her chest... or the "Plastic Bag Of Death", where she gets into a large plastic bag and one of the other performers sucks all of the air out with a vacuum cleaner. She would also employ an electric grinder in her act (for example, she would create a shower of sparks from a metal chastity belt covering her groin area).
 Matt "The Tube" Crowley, whose moniker came from the seven feet of tubing that he would swallow. The other end of the tube was attached to a crude hand pump. Rose himself would fill the pump with a variety of fluids and proceed to pump it into Crowley's stomach, then back out again. Audience members were invited onstage to drink the vile concoction after it had been extricated from Crowley. He would also provide a demonstration of sheer lung power by blowing up a hot water bottle with his mouth until it burst. Other gags included sucking a black condom in through his mouth and out his nose (and reversing the procedure) and working a long piece of plastic fluorescent cord through his nasal passages in order to "floss" his nose. 
 Zamora the Torture King (Tim Cridland) had a segment that featured him walking barefoot up and down a ladder of razor sharp sabres, piercing himself with long needles and meat skewers, eating pieces of a broken lightbulb (he would hold a microphone near his mouth so the audience would hear the sound), and touching an electrical generator while holding a fluorescent lightbulb that would glow. 
 The Enigma (Paul Lawrence), originally known as Slug, was billed as a man who would eat anything (including slugs, worms, and grasshoppers), and swallow a variety of swords. He also doubled as the show's organ player. His body is completely tattooed with blue jigsaw puzzle pieces. 
 The Lizardman performed by Eric Sprague (born 1972) is a completely tattooed performer with a surgically split tongue (featured on Ripley's Believe It or Not) joined Jim in 1999 on the Godsmack Voodoo Tour and in 2001 toured with just Jim and Bebe doing comedy clubs.  He performed several acts previously done by members who had left.
 Cappy (David Capurro) is a yoyo artist.  Featured in The Jim Rose Twisted Tour.
 Rupert (Ryan Stock) performed the traditional sideshow stunts.  He now stars in his own show on the Discovery Channel with partner Amber Lynn.
 John Chaos performs traditional stunts. He later staged his own one-man show, the John Chaos Sideshow, mixing classic and new stunts with offbeat humor and magic tricks. Chaos still performs with the Jim Rose Circus from time to time.
 Jake "the Snake" Roberts
 SiNn BoHdi formally known as Kizarny of the WWE
 Brianna Belladonna, a female sword swallower who performed at Sturgis with the circus in 2010.
 Jimmy Coffin, a working act. Later he toured the US as a solo sideshow artist as the "Jimmy Coffin Sideshow".
 "Fat Matt" Alaeddine, billed as the world's fattest contortionist

Television and other media

Jim Rose and The Enigma were featured in the Season 2 episode of The X-Files, "Humbug"; the episode was set in a community of sideshow and former sideshow workers.

Homer Simpson runs away and joins the Jim Rose Circus as a cannonball catcher (not to be confused with a human cannonball) on the episode "Homerpalooza" of The Simpsons.

The Jim Rose Circus Sideshow video tape (1993 American Recordings) was re-released in 2003 as a DVD by Moonshine Music.

The Jim Rose Twisted Tour was a seven-episode series that debuted March 2003 on the opening week of the Travel Channel, although only five episodes were aired. It was released in 2006 on DVD, which includes all episodes.

Jim Rose appeared in the movie Doubting Riley, a film by HBO's Project Greenlight alumni.

Publications
Jim Rose wrote the autobiographical Freak Like Me (Real, Raw, and Dangerous) with journalist Melissa Rossi in 1995. The book describes Rose's early years and features a stream of consciousness on-the-road account of the Jim Rose Circus tour with Lollapalooza. The book's title is a reference to Black Like Me.

Rose also released the book 'Snake Oil (Life's Calculations, Misdirections, And Manipulations) in 2005.

Rose was written about extensively in Marilyn Manson's autobiography 'Long Hard Road Out Of Hell'.  The stories refer to the 1994 'Downward Spiral Tour' with Marilyn Manson and Nine Inch Nails.

Politics

According to an interview with Oddities Magazine, Jim Rose claims to have been involved in fundraising for the Mo Udall political campaign during a time in his life when he was addicted to heroin. He was quoted as stating that "[Mo] ran against Jimmy Carter and I was his fundraiser... I used to do fundraisers with like Gregory Peck and Robert Redford, actually while I was on heroin. They didn’t know... actually I forgot to tell them."

Consultant

Rose has been hired by corporations including Microsoft and regularly speaks as a consultant for PR firms; in this regard he has been pictured on the cover of The Wall Street Journal and Fast Company, and is featured in the marketing book The Deviant's Advantage.

In 2008 Rose was hired as spokesperson and performer for Dos Equis in the "Jim Rose Most Interesting Show In The World" U.S tour.  Rose has also served as a spokesman for Gordon's Gin.

ReceptionRolling Stone described the circus as an "absolute must-see act". The Independent praised the show as "brutally comic", adding that Rose "plays the highly-strung audience like a violin". Melody Maker compared the "revolted amusement" of the audience to that of tourists at a bullfight.

British Circus proprietor Gerry Cottle said, "I've seen a lot of things in my time. I must see 40 circuses a year, but this lot... They came on in their street clothes and then... They're beyond anything I've ever seen. They shocked me." The Times Magazine'' said that while it may not be everyone's idea of entertainment, it certainly did not deserve to be banned.

References

External links
Official website
Stone Pony Photos of Jim Rose Circus, June 6, 2002
Circus review
Mr. Lifto interview
Oddities Magazine interview with Jim Rose

Circuses
Sideshows
American stunt performers